LCSC may stand for:

 Lewis–Clark State College, USA
 London Corinthian Sailing Club, England